The river  'Selbe'  (Mongolian: Сэлбэ) flows at an altitude between 1850 and 1350 meters above sea level through the southern part of the Khentii mountain system in the central part of  Mongolia. This river is 26.2 km long and the river basin covers 220 square kilometers. 

The river flows through the Mongolian capital Ulaanbaatar, and merges into the Tuul river. The inter Ulaanbaatar city Selbe basin was renovated in 2012. Before this reconstruction the river was mostly dry during colder seasons.  In the same year, the river parts in Ulaanbaatar area was declared protected status to protect against city pollutions.

See also
List of rivers of Mongolia

References

Rivers of Mongolia
Ulaanbaatar